Hamilton Pierce "Mac" McWhorter (born June 17, 1950) is a former offensive line coach for the Penn State Nittany Lions and was the interim head coach for Georgia Tech's football team in 2001  after George O'Leary resigned and only coached for one game, the 2001 Seattle Bowl against No. 11-ranked Stanford. Tech won, 24 to 14, technically giving McWhorter the highest win percentage of any Georgia Tech football coach.

McWhorter was an All-SEC guard at Georgia in 1973.  McWhorter retired following the 2010 season with the Longhorns. The American Football Coaches of America voted Longhorn offensive line coach Mac McWhorter the top assistant coach in the country for 2008.

After spending 2011 out of football following his retirement at Texas, Penn State's new football coach Bill O'Brien convinced McWhorter to join the staff at Penn State, following the death of Joe Paterno. McWhorter, who one sportswriter described as O'Brien's "biggest get" onto the coaching staff at Penn State, despite his enjoyment of retirement and attending football games as a fan of the Georgia Bulldogs, agreed, and moved to the northeast for the first time in his life.  His tenure at Penn State was not expected to last particularly long for a variety of reasons including parents in worsening health and grandchildren, but while at Penn State, he was beloved among his players, including offensive guard Miles Dieffenbach, who commented,  McWhorter noted that he loved coaching at Penn State, but had no timetable for how long he would coach. McWhorter retired following the 2013 season once again after not being retained by James Franklin.

Head coaching record

Notes

References

External links
 Texas profile

 

1950 births
Living people
Alabama Crimson Tide football coaches
Clemson Tigers football coaches
Duke Blue Devils football coaches
Georgia Bulldogs football coaches
Georgia Bulldogs football players
Georgia Tech Yellow Jackets football coaches
Memphis Tigers football coaches
Texas Longhorns football coaches
West Georgia Wolves football coaches
High school football coaches in Georgia (U.S. state)
Penn State Nittany Lions football coaches
Players of American football from Atlanta